Pultenaea maidenii, commonly known as Maiden's bush-pea, is an extinct species of flowering plant in the family Fabaceae and was endemic to Victoria, Australia. It was an erect shrub with egg-shaped leaves with the narrower end towards the base, and pea-shaped flowers.

Description
Flowering occurred in November.

Taxonomy and naming
Pultenaea maidenii was first formally described in 1906 by Felix Reader in The Victorian Naturalist from specimens collected in 1904 by Herbert Bennett Williamson "at the Pipehead Reservoir of the Hamilton Waterworks, on the Victoria Range, Dundas County, Victoria". The specific epithet (maidenii) honours Joseph Maiden.

Distribution
Maiden's bush-pea grows is only known from the collections made by Williamson between 1903 and 1906 on the south-western side of the Vicroia Range in the Grampians.

Conservation status
Pultenaea maidenii is listed as "extinct" under the Australian Government Environment Protection and Biodiversity Conservation Act 1999.

References

maidenii
Flora of Victoria (Australia)
Plants described in 1906